Thor's Hammer (1983) is the title of two  science fiction novels, one by Australian author Wynne Whiteford, about mining in the asteroids, and another (2017) by U.S. author David Rogers, about a future world and a group of people with powers to jump through time and space in search of a better world.

Whiteford describes an attempt by an unbalanced fanatic stationed in the asteroid belt to destroy Earth civilisation by directing an asteroid at Earth. Rogers imagines a world troubled by overpopulation and environmental disaster and suggests what the fate of the human race in such a world may be.

See also 
 Thor's Hammer, the mythological weapon wielded by Thor
 Asteroids in fiction

References

 Chained to the Alien: The Best of Australian Science Fiction Review 
 Strange Constellations: A History of Australian Science Fiction
 Wynne Whiteford
 Obituaries in the Performing Arts, 2002: Film, Television, Radio, Theatre, Dance, Music, Cartoons and Pop Culture
 Wynne Whiteford
 Aust Lit Wynne Whiteford
 Wynne Whiteford
 Wynne Whiteford
 Ditmar Award nomination

External links 
Wynne Whiteford
Thor's Hammer at Fantastic Fiction

1983 novels
1983 science fiction novels
Australian science fiction novels